Yevgeny Petrov, also named Evgeny or Yevgeni Petrov was the pen name of Yevgeny Petrovich Katayev (in Odesa – July 2, 1942) who was a popular Soviet author in the 1920s and 1930s. He often worked in collaboration with Ilya Ilf. As Ilf and Petrov, they wrote The Twelve Chairs, released in 1928, and its sequel, The Little Golden Calf, released in 1931.

Biography

Following Germany's invasion of the Soviet Union, Petrov became a war correspondent. He was killed in a plane crash while returning from besieged Sevastopol. The short film Envelope was dedicated to him.

He was the brother of Valentin Kataev.

References

1902 births
1942 deaths
Writers from Odesa
People from Kherson Governorate
Soviet short story writers
20th-century short story writers
Soviet novelists
Soviet male writers
20th-century Russian male writers

Soviet civilians killed in World War II
Victims of aviation accidents or incidents in the Soviet Union
Victims of aviation accidents or incidents in 1942
Soviet war correspondents
War correspondents of World War II
Journalists killed while covering World War II
Ogoniok editors